The Karamay oil field is an oil field located in Xinjiang. It was discovered in 1955 and developed by China National Petroleum Corporation. It began production in 1955 and produces oil.

References

Oil fields in China